Plum Run is a  long 2nd order tributary to Chartiers Run in Washington County, Pennsylvania.

Course
Plum Run rises about 2 miles southwest of Venice, Pennsylvania, and then flows southeast to join Chartiers Run at Houston.

Watershed
Plum Run drains  of area, receives about 39.2 in/year of precipitation, has a wetness index of 324.74, and is about 45% forested.

See also
 List of rivers of Pennsylvania

References

Rivers of Pennsylvania
Rivers of Washington County, Pennsylvania